Sascha Klör (born 16 August 1985) is a retired German tennis player.

Klör has a career high ATP singles ranking of 375 achieved on 19 June 2006. He also has a career high ATP doubles ranking of 578 achieved on 12 December 2005.

Klör made his ATP main draw debut at the 2009 BMW Open after qualifying for the singles main draw. He was defeated by eventual champion Tomáš Berdych in the first round.

References

External links

1985 births
Living people
German male tennis players
Sportspeople from Krefeld
Tennis people from North Rhine-Westphalia